Johan Epner (or Johannes Epner; born 1893) was an Estonian politician. He was a member of Estonian Constituent Assembly. He was a member of the assembly since 4 February 1920. He replaced Nikolai Köstner. On 31 July 1920, he resigned his post and he was replaced by Verner Nerep.

References

1893 births
Year of death missing
Estonian Social Democratic Workers' Party politicians
Members of the Estonian Constituent Assembly